This Is My Element is an Element skateboarding video. It was their 8th video, and was released and premiered on June 21, 2007, Go Skateboarding Day, at 100 locations in the U.S., 34 of them in California alone. It was highly anticipated, and features tricks performed at 350 worldwide locations. The list price for the video was $23.99.

Content
This is My Element features appearances from over 20 people. The full parts are from most of Element's pro team, and from several of their rising amateurs. In chronological order-
Nyjah Huston
Chad Muska
Brent Atchley
Chad TimTim
Justin Schulte
Jimmy Lannon
Bam Margera
International Team
Mike Barker
Levi Brown
Mike Vallely
Bucky Lasek
Collin Provost
Tosh Townend
Darrell Stanton
Tony Tave

Soundtrack
Intro - Odd Nosdam - Time In
Nyjah Huston - Odd Nosdam - Top Rank
Chad Muska - Odd Nosdam - Trunk Bomb
Brent Atchley - Odd Nosdam - Fly Mode
Chad Tim Tim, Justin Schulte, Jimmy Lannon - Odd Nosdam - Ethereal Slap
Bam Margera Intro - Odd Nosdam - Cop Crush
Bam Margera - Moistboyz - The Tweaker
International Team - Odd Nosdam - Zone Coaster
Mike Barker - Odd Nosdam - Root Bark
Levi Brown - Odd Nosdam - One For Dallas
Mike Vallely, Chris Senn, Bucky Lasek - Odd Nosdam - We Bad Apples
Collin Provost - Odd Nosdam - Rocker Fit
Tosh Townend - Odd Nosdam - Shut This Down
Darrell Stanton - Odd Nosdam - D's Chamber
Tony Tave - Odd Nosdam - Wig Smasher
Credits - Odd Nosdam - Time Out

References

External links 
 

Skateboarding videos
2000s English-language films